Somerville is a town in Lincoln County, Maine, United States. The population was 600 at the 2020 census. Somerville is located 15 miles east of the state capital, Augusta.

Geography

Demographics

2010 census
As of the census of 2010, there were 548 people, 225 households, and 153 families residing in the town. The racial makeup of the town was 94.7% White, 0.4% African American, 0.2% Native American, 1.8% Asian, 0.4% from other races, and 2.6% from two or more races. Hispanic or Latino of any race were 2.7% of the population.

There were 225 households, of which 26.7% had children under the age of 18 living with them, 50.7% were married couples living together, 8.9% had a female householder with no husband present, 8.4% had a male householder with no wife present, and 32.0% were non-families. 26.2% of all households were made up of individuals, and 8.9% had someone living alone who was 65 years of age or older. The average household size was 2.44 and the average family size was 2.84.

The median age in the town was 44 years. 23.5% of residents were under the age of 18; 4.8% were between the ages of 18 and 24; 22.3% were from 25 to 44; 35.6% were from 45 to 64; and 13.9% were 65 years of age or older. The gender makeup of the town was 52.0% male and 48.0% female.

2000 census
As of the census of 2000, there were 509 people, 202 households, and 136 families residing in the town.  The population density was 23.3 people per square mile (9.0/km).  There were 286 housing units at an average density of 13.1 per square mile (5.0/km).  The racial makeup of the town was 97.64% White, 0.20% African American, 0.98% Native American, 0.20% Asian, and 0.98% from two or more races. Hispanic or Latino of any race were 0.98% of the population.

There were 202 households, out of which 28.7% had children under the age of 18 living with them, 55.9% were married couples living together, 6.9% had a female householder with no husband present, and 32.2% were non-families. 25.7% of all households were made up of individuals, and 6.9% had someone living alone who was 65 years of age or older.  The average household size was 2.52 and the average family size was 3.01.

In the town, the population was spread out, with 26.9% under the age of 18, 4.7% from 18 to 24, 29.1% from 25 to 44, 29.3% from 45 to 64, and 10.0% who were 65 years of age or older.  The median age was 41 years. For every 100 females, there were 105.2 males.  For every 100 females age 18 and over, there were 104.4 males.

The median income for a household in the town was $37,125, and the median income for a family was $40,455. Males had a median income of $26,818 versus $24,500 for females. The per capita income for the town was $15,906.  About 16.4% of families and 21.7% of the population were below the poverty line, including 30.4% of those under age 18 and 17.2% of those age 65 or over.

Notable people

 Chris Johnson, former state legislator 
 Mary Winchenbach, star of TruTV original show ‘Tirdy Works’

References

External links
Town Information from Maine.gov
Epodunk Profile
History of Somerville
Maine Genealogy: Somerville, Lincoln County, Maine

Towns in Lincoln County, Maine
Towns in Maine